The World Snooker Trickshot Championship was a trick shot world championship, played on Snooker tables; generally played by primarily Snooker-based players. The event was played between 1991 and 2006, and was organised by Matchroom Sport. Events generally used a combination of judges scores, and audience vote to determine the winners.

Tournament winners

References 

World championships in pool
Recurring sporting events established in 1991